Yllka Kuqi (born 26  November 1982) is a Kosovo-Albanian singer.

In 2005, she entered the sixth edition of the Kënga Magjike competition with the song "Dhe të dua" ("And I Love You"). Those finals were held on January 23, for the first time on Kosovo soil in Pristina, and she placed second, behind Irma Libohova and ahead of Pirro Çako. She also won a "Best Vocalist" award there. In 2006, she placed eighth with 95 points for "Më merr" ("Take Me"), just ahead of Rona Nishliu. Armend Rexhepagiqi won with 293 points, just ahead of Ledina Çelo, but Kuqi was again awarded a consolation prize, this time for "Best Melody."

Kuqi has also participated in the Festivali i Këngës, entering in 2005 with the song "Të gjeta" ("I Found You"). She made the second semi-final on December 17, but was eliminated before the finale the next day.

Discography
 Dhe të dua

Sources
 Tekste Shqip

References

1982 births
21st-century Albanian women singers
Albanian pop singers
Living people
Kosovan people of Albanian descent
Kosovan singers
Musicians from Gjakova